Gurpreet Sohi  (born July 20, 1994) is a Canadian water polo player from Delta, British Columbia. She is a member of the Canada women's national water polo team. She will participate in the 2020 Summer Olympics.

Career
She participated at the 2017 FINA Women's Water Polo World League, 2018 FINA Women's Water Polo World League,  2019 FINA Women's Water Polo World League, and 2018 FINA Women's Water Polo World Cup.

She played for Stanford University.  

In June 2021, Sohi was named to Canada's 2020 Summer Olympics team.

References 

1994 births
Living people
Canadian female water polo players
Water polo players at the 2020 Summer Olympics
People from White Rock, British Columbia
Olympic water polo players of Canada